In grammar, an adessive case (abbreviated ; from Latin adesse "to be present (at)": ad "at" + esse "to be") is a grammatical case generally denoting location at, upon, or adjacent to the referent of the noun; the term is most frequently used in Uralic studies. It is also used as an instrumental case in Finnish.

In Finnish, the suffix is /, e.g.

In Estonian, the ending -l is added to the genitive case, e.g.  (table) -  (on the table). Besides the meaning "on", this case is also used to indicate ownership. For example, "mehel on auto" means "the man owns a car".

As the Uralic languages don't possess the verb "to have", it is the subject in the adessive case + on (for example, "I have", literally "at me is").

The other locative cases in Finnish, Estonian, and Hungarian are:
Inessive case ("in")
Elative case ("out of")
Illative case ("into")
Allative case ("onto")
Ablative case ("off")
Superessive case ("on top of, or on the surface of")

Finnish

It is usually added to nouns and associated adjectives. 

It is used in the following ways.

 Expressing the static state of being on the surface of something. 
Possible English meanings of on, on top of, atop 
  the pen is on the table  

As an existential clause with the verb olla (to be) to express possession
This is the Finnish way to express the English verb to have
  we have a dog ('on our (possession, responsibility, etc.) is dog')

 Expressing the instrumental use of something
Possible English meanings of with, by, using
 he went to Helsinki by train
 he bought it for a euro

 In certain time expressions expressing the time at which things take place
Possible English meanings of during in over 
 in the morning  in the spring

 Expressing the general proximity in space or time at which something takes place (where the more specific proximity case would be the inessive)
Possible English meaning of at
  my son is at school (c.f. inessive case:  my son is inside the school) 
 he is at lunch - literally on the lunch hour
(Although not strictly a use of the adessive this proximity difference is mirrored in adverbial forms such as  - around here and  - right here)

Non-Uralic

Other languages which employ an adessive case or case function include archaic varieties of Lithuanian, some Northeast Caucasian languages such as Lezgian and Hunzib, and the Ossetic languages, both ancient and modern.

Further reading

 
 

Grammatical cases